Milíon is the debut studio album by American rapper Half a Mill. It was released on May 9, 2000, via Warlock Records. Production was handled by several record producers, including DJ Scratch, Just Blaze, Trackmasters and The Neptunes. It features guest appearances from Ali Vegas, AZ, Kool G Rap, Musolini, Nature, N.O.R.E. and Spice 1. The album peaked at number 91 on the Billboard Top R&B/Hip-Hop Albums chart and sold 40,000 copies.

Track listing

Charts

References

External links

2000 debut albums
East Coast hip hop albums
Albums produced by DJ Scratch
Albums produced by Just Blaze
Albums produced by the Neptunes
Albums produced by Trackmasters